The second season of the Spanish television show Got Talent España - a revival of the 2008 show Tienes Talento -  was broadcast from 22 January to 21 March 2017. The winner of the show was rock and roll dancer El Tekila even through getting buzzed in both the semi-final and the grand final the Spain public voted as the winner whilst Samuel Martí Pérez was runners up and dance group Progenyx finished in 3rd place. The series once again featured the "golden buzzer" which each judge and host can press once or twice this season to put an act straight through to the live semi-finals. The judges can also use the golden buzzer in a semi-final show if all the judges agree on an act they press it and the act goes straight through to the Grand Final.
This series Risto Mejide joined the judging panel with last years judges Edurne, Eva Hache and Jorge Javier Vázquez. Santi Millán  returned as host.

Auditions

Week 1 (22 January 2017)

Semi-finalist summary

14 acts perform each week, Four of whom will make it through to the final. Each judge can buzz an act in the semi-finals. If an act receives four buzzers, it will be ended, but the public can still vote at home. Also one act out of the four will go through to the final from a golden buzzer from the judges.

Semi-Final 1 (28 February 2017)

Semi-Final 2 (7 March 2017)

Semi-Final 3 (14 March 2017)

Last Opportunity (Wildcards) (20 March 2017)

Grand Final (21 March 2017) 

2017 Spanish television seasons
Spain